Elchin Musaoglu [Guliyev] (born 11 July 1966, in Baku, Azerbaijan) is an Azerbaijani filmmaker best known for his award-winning movie The 40th Door and Oscar contender Nabat.
Musaoglu is a member of the Union of the Azerbaijan Cinematographers and the Union of Turkish Documentary Cinematographers, and a founder of the Society for Support of the Development of Documentary Films and Authorial Programs.

Early life
Although Musaoglu's father, Musa Guliyev, was a professor of historical sciences, Musaoglu spent his youth in the villages of Azerbaijan where he made theatrical performances with other youths often accepting fruit in lieu of payment. 

In 2004 he established RITM Production Company together with his co-workers. The company produced documentaries, short films and The 40th Door, which was the first full-length feature film in the history of RITM Production Company as well as the film director and script writer Elchin Musaoglu.

Peter Debruge from Variety said: The 40th Door' is no Hollywood-style rags-to-riches tale, offering instead a stripped-down neorealist fable in the vein of Vittorio De Sica and the strong Iranian films of a decade ago. There may be something overly familiar about such stories by now, and yet this one feels fresh and free from cliche, a touching portrait with the potential for modest arthouse returns.”

Musaoglu's 2014 film Nabat was Azerbaijan's entry for Academy Awards in 2015.

Filmography (major films)

1990 –	Leyla and Majnun (55 minutes 16 mm)
1994 – Killer (65 minutes TV)
1995 –	P.S. (70 minutes TV)
1996 –	The Third Side of the Record (35 minutes TV)
1997 –	A Grain of Sand (49 minutes TV)
1997 –	A Diary of a Traveller (37 minutes TV)
1998 – The Azerbaijan Carpet  (65 minutes TV)
1999 –	Magister  Dixet (74 minutes TV)
2000 –	Niyazi (60 minutes TV)
2001 –	The Sun and the Cloud (28 minutes TV)
2002 –	The Light of My Eyes (16 minutes TV)
2003 –	Glass Toys (12 minutes TV)
2007 –	German-Azerbaijan Friendship Relations (45 minutes TV)
2008 –	The 40th Door (Feature film, 82 minutes 35mm)
2014 – Nabat (Feature film, 105 min HD)

Awards

Glass Toys
2006 – Al Jazeera International Television Production Festival – (winner The Golden Award).

The 40th Door
2009 – The 42nd Houston International Film Festival (winner Gold Remi Award. Foreign);
2009 – The 11th Baku “East-West” International Film Festival (winner Best Debut Award);
2009 – XIV International TV Festival Bar Montenegro (winner 1. Silver Olive,   2. Best Directing,   3. Best Photography Awards);
2009 – 19th Cottbus International Film Festival (winner  1. The Prize of the Ecumenical Jury a Special Mention,   2. The International Film Guide Inspiration Award);
2010 – Tiburon International Film Festival (winner Federico Fellini Award);
2010 – The 6th Eurasia International Film Festival Almaty (winner Juri Netpac Award);
2010 – New York Eurasian Film Festival (winner Best Script).

NABAT
Festivals:
 71st Venice International Film Festival, Italy. August 27-September 6, 2014.  "Orizzonti Competition"
 Milan Film Festival, Italy  Le vie del cinema. I film di Venezia a Milano. September 15–24, 2014.
 50th Chicago International Film Festival, USA. October 9–23, 2014. "World Cinema Program"
 38th São Paulo International Film Festival, Brazil. October 16–29, 2014. "Competition Section"
 27th Tokyo International Film Festival, Japan. October 23–31, 2014. "Main Competition Section"
 63rd International Filmfestival Mannheim-Heidelberg, Germany. November 6–16, 2014. "Competition Section"
 18th Tallinn Black Nights Film Festival, Estonia.November 14–30, 2014. "Forum / Focus on hot topics" 
 45th International Film Festival of India, Goa. November 20–30, 2014. "Competition Section"
 14th Marrakesh International Film Festival, Morocco. December 5–13, 2014. "Competition Section"
 26th Palm Springs International Film Festival, USA. January 2–12, 2015. "Awards Buzz" lineup
 13th Pune International Film Festival, India. January 8–15, 2015. "World Competition Section"
 27th Tokyo International Film Festival, Lineup, Japan. February 28, 2015
 Aga Khan Museum, Toronto, Canada. March 18, 2015.
 34th Istanbul International Film Festival, Turkey. April 4–19, 2015. "New Visions Section"
 33rd Fajr International Film Festival, Iran. April 25-May 2, 2015. "Eastern Panorama" Competition Section
 26th Ankara International Film Festival, Turkey. April 23-May 3, 2015.
 Tripoli Film Festival, Lebanon. April 30-May 7, 2015. "Competition Section"
 9th Five Lakes Filmfestival, Bavaria, Germany. July 29-August 9, 2015. "Main Competition Section"
 11th Eurasia International Film Festival, Almaty, Kazakhstan. September 19–25, 2015. "Competition Section"
 4th LET’S CEE Film Festival, Vienna, Austria. October 1–11, 2015. "Competition Section"
 16th Arabisches Film Festival, Tübingen, Germany. October 2–10, 2015. "Islamic and Oriental" Countries
 3rd Boğaziçi Film Festival, Turkey. November 20–28. 2015

Awards
 Mannheim-Heidelberg Award Mannheim-Heidelberg International Filmfestival
 International Film Critics’ Prize Mannheim-Heidelberg International Filmfestival
 Prize by the Ecumenical Jury Mannheim-Heidelberg International Filmfestival
 Special Mention Award Pune International Film Festival
 Best Director Fajr International Film Festival
 Best Film Tripoli Film Festival, Lebanon
 Best director Eurasia International Film Festival
 Best Performance by an Actress Eurasia International Film Festival
 Best Performance by an Actress LET’S CEE Film Festival
 Best Performance by an Actress Bosphorus Film Festival

References

External links
http://www.huffingtonpost.com/e-nina-rothe/best-of-venice-nabat-beca_b_5803934.html
http://www.artslife.com/2014/09/11/nabat/
http://flickfeast.co.uk/feature/nabat-2014/
http://flickfeast.co.uk/spotlight/nabat-interview-elchin-musaoglu-fatemeh-motamed-arya/
http://www.seniorweb.ch/knowledge-article/eine-mutter-leistet-widerstand

1966 births
Azerbaijani film directors
Film people from Baku
Living people